The Master of the Altarpiece of the Ten Commandments was a German painter active in the region of Göttingen at the beginning of the fifteenth century.  His name is derived from a portable altarpiece, depicting the Ten Commandments, which is believed to have at one time stood in the chapel of the Sacred Heart in Göttingen, constructed in 1319.  Only the central part of the painting survives, today in the history museum in Hannover; it depicts six scenes in two registers, showing the second, third, fourth, seventh, eight, and ninth Commandments.  The wings, illustrating the other four, are now lost.  At the top of the composition is a half-length figure of Christ holding a scroll on which are inscribed the Commandments.

''This article is based on a translation of the corresponding article in the Italian Wikipedia.

15th-century German painters
Altarpiece of the Ten Commandments, Master of the